Caliroa cinxia is a species of insect belonging to the family Tenthredinidae.

It is native to Europe.

Synonym:
 Tenthredo cinxia Klug, 1816

References

Tenthredinidae